Kadima Kabangu (born 15 June 1993) is a Congolese footballer currently plays for Congolese club Motema Pembe in the Linafoot.

Career

Club
Kabangu previously played for the Congolese club FC Saint-Éloi Lupopo, until in 2016 he moved to Budapest Honvéd FC in Hungary.

International

International goals
Scores and results list DR Congo's goal tally first.

Career statistics

Club

References

External links

Kadima Kabangu at Footballdatabase

1993 births
Living people
Footballers from Kinshasa
Democratic Republic of the Congo footballers
Democratic Republic of the Congo international footballers
Association football forwards
Budapest Honvéd FC players
Budapest Honvéd FC II players
FC Shirak players
Raja CA players
Daring Club Motema Pembe players
Maghreb de Fès players
Nemzeti Bajnokság I players
Armenian Premier League players
Linafoot players
Botola players
Expatriate footballers in Hungary
Expatriate footballers in Armenia
Expatriate footballers in Morocco
Democratic Republic of the Congo expatriate sportspeople in Hungary
Democratic Republic of the Congo expatriate sportspeople in Morocco
21st-century Democratic Republic of the Congo people
Democratic Republic of the Congo A' international footballers
2020 African Nations Championship players
Democratic Republic of the Congo expatriate sportspeople in Armenia